Praia de Santa Maria is a beach on the south coast of the island of Sal, Cape Verde. It stretches from the city center of Santa Maria in the east to the Ponta do Sinó (the island's southernmost point) in the southwest. It is about 2 km long. Along with Praia da Ponta Preta, it is the most popular beach on the city and island. 

Each year in mid September, the island's music festival Festival da Praia de Santa Maria takes place at the beach.

See also
List of beaches in Cape Verde
Tourism in Cape Verde

References

External links

Santa Maria, Cape Verde
Beaches of Cape Verde
Geography of Sal, Cape Verde